Ahmed Umar Bolori  is an Ambassador for Peace and an activist from Borno State, who currently serves as the Special Adviser to the Executive Governor of Kogi State on Public Relations and also the Head of Communications and Liaison at the Kogi State Investment Promotion Agency.

Education 

Ahmed Bolori holds Bachelor's degree in International Relations from Ecotes Benin University. He also holds a Bachelor's degree in Public Administration and a Master's Degree in International Affairs and Diplomacy, both from the prestigious Ahmadu Bello University, Zaria.

Career 
As a social commentator, he has often times appeared on BBC, Jazeera, DW, among other local and international media outlets. Prior to his appointment as Special Adviser, Ahmed served as Executive Director of Exit Lanes, a nonprofit  organization dedicated to peace building, social inclusion, and community development. Following Boko Haram insurgencies in Nigeria, Chad, Niger, and Cameroon, as well as other political instabilities that resulted in economic deprivation, poverty, and insecurity, Ahmed Bolori advocated for and coordinated a counterterrorism awareness network to improve education, peace building, de-radicalization, and youth empowerment to help counter/prevent violent extremism. He has worked with a variety of organizations on issues such as livelihood, protection and entrepreneurship development.

In order to address these challenges in the face of increasing terrorism pressure, Ahmed has participated in several conferences and meetings with international and national counterterrorism stakeholders such as the Nigerian Army, Nigerian National Security institutions, and stakeholders from the United Kingdom, the Middle East, and others from around the world. Ahmed met with Tibet's spiritual leader, Dalai Lama, one-on-one to learn about the pursuit of peace. He is an entrepreneur who shares the vision of the Sustainable Development Goals.

Recognition 

In 2017, the United States Institute of Peace selected Ahmed Bolori as one of 25 international Youth Leaders working in the world's most terrorized zones to build their capacity in working on peace building in their respective countries. The training which was held at the Dalai Lama's home in India, was also intended to better equip these youth leaders to rebuild their societies during and after violence. These among other achievements, has earned Ahmed an influence among his peers in Nigeria's North East, where terrorism is hampering growth and development. The Universal Peace Federation also appointed him as an Ambassador for Peace.

Popularity 

Following his participation in the dialogue process to end the Boko Haram insurgency in Northeast Nigeria, the Nigerian Army declared him wanted in 2016, along with Ahmed Salkida and Aisha Alkali Wakil. He turned himself in immediately after learning of his declaration, but the Nigerian Army authorities refused to detain him, instead asked him to go home and return the next day. This sparked debate with many questioning the military's hasty decision to declare him wanted without due process. However, the authorities later exonerated him, which earned him the admiration of youths and activists across the country.

To motivate others, he has severally talked about his experience on Social Media and even on TEDx.

References

External links
 Amb. Ahmed Umar Bolori on LinkedIn

Living people
People from Borno State
Kanuri people
Ahmadu Bello University alumni
Year of birth missing (living people)